Ndwedwe is a town in Ilembe District Municipality in the KwaZulu-Natal province of South Africa.

The village is 60 km north of Durban and about 20 km west-north-west of Tongaat. Of Zulu origin, the name is said to mean "long, bare table-land or ridge," or "pensive," referring to its peaceful setting in the Valley of a Thousand Hills.

Notable residents
 Sihle Zikalala, 8th Premier of KwaZulu-Natal

References

Populated places in the Ndwedwe Local Municipality